Axon Tremolo is the eponymously-debut and only studio album by Axon Tremolo, released on July 20, 2018 by Rodentia Productions.  Online magazine I Die: You Die stated, "a quick skim suggests some detours from the wholly sample-based methods on which Vahnke build his reputation for the sake of some smoother jams, or, in Vahnke's own words, "adult-contemporary new-age synth."

Track listing

Personnel
Adapted from the Axon Tremolo liner notes.

Axon Tremolo
 Daniel Vahnke – sampler, vocals (2, 3, 7, 9, 11, 13, 14)

Additional performers
 Lauren Kaplan – vocals (5)

Production
 Neil Wojewodzki – mastering, editing

Release history

References

External links 
 Axon Tremolo at Discogs (list of releases)
 Axon Tremolo at Bandcamp
 Axon Tremolo at iTunes

2018 debut albums
Ambient pop albums
Sound collage albums